Secondary Boarding School is an English medium school, located in Dharan and Itahari, Nepal.

History 
Secondary Boarding School was founded and established by Mr. Edmund Atal (Alital) Singh in 1969 located at Laxmi Sadak, Dharan, Sunsari. It was the first privately owned English medium School in Eastern Nepal. Later it extended its branch in Itahari, Sunsari.

Itahari Branch

Itahari Branch of Secondari Boarding School was established on 2022 B.S. Since then it has been established as one of the pioneer of educational system in Itahari area. Many students passed out from this institution are working and studying in different parts of world. The headmistress of Itahari branch is Mrs. Mina Subba. But the daily office administration is run by Mr. Arun Kumar Jha. It runs the class from Nursery level to Class 10.

Notable alumni
Sabin Rai (one of the most popular singer of Nepal) 

Educational institutions established in 1969
Schools in Nepal
1969 establishments in Nepal